Sir Francis Graham-Smith (born 25 April 1923) is a British astronomer. He was the thirteenth Astronomer Royal from 1982 to 1990 and was knighted in 1986.

Biography

Education
He was educated at Rossall School, Lancashire, England, and attended Downing College, Cambridge from 1941.

Career
In the late 1940s he worked at the University of Cambridge on the Long Michelson Interferometer.

In 1964 he was appointed Professor of Radio Astronomy the University of Manchester and in 1981 director of the Nuffield Radio Astronomy Laboratories, part of the University of Manchester at Jodrell Bank. He was also Director of the Royal Greenwich Observatory from 1975 to 1981.

He appeared in Episode 13 of Series 4 of Treasure Hunt when the show visited Jodrell Bank, giving presenter Anneka Rice a piggy back to allow her to reach a clue.

Bibliography 

 Optics (1971)
 Pathways to the Universe (1988)
 Pulsar Astronomy (1990)
 An Introduction to Radio Astronomy (1997)
 Unseen Cosmos (2013)
 Eyes on the Sky (2016)

Personal life 
Graham-Smith is an avid bee-keeper and kept up this hobby well into his 90s, looking after the hives at Jodrell Bank. He also inspired the creation of the St Andrews Amateur Beekeeping Society.

He lived with his wife Elizabeth in the Old School House in Henbury, Cheshire, from 1981 until her death in 2021. They had met when they were both working with Martin Ryle in 1945-6 in Cambridge in the early days of radio astronomy.

Honours
He was elected a Fellow of the Royal Society in 1970  and was awarded their Royal Medal in 1987.

He was president of the Royal Astronomical Society from 1975 to 1977.

He was the thirteenth Astronomer Royal from 1982 to 1990.

He won the Richard Glazebrook Medal and Prize in 1991.

Patronage
Sir Francis Graham-Smith is a Distinguished Supporter of Humanists UK is the President of Macclesfield Astronomical Society and is a patron of Mansfield and Sutton Astronomical Society.

Lectures
In 1965 he was invited to co-deliver the Royal Institution Christmas Lecture on Exploration of the Universe.

References

External links

Scienceworld biography
 Online catalogue of F. Graham Smith's working papers as director of the Royal Greenwich Observatory (held at Cambridge University Library)

1923 births
Place of birth missing (living people)
People educated at Rossall School
Alumni of Downing College, Cambridge
Astronomers Royal
20th-century British astronomers
British humanists
Fellows of Downing College, Cambridge
Knights Bachelor
Living people
Royal Medal winners
Fellows of the Royal Society
Presidents of the Royal Astronomical Society